Golden Lies is a 2000 album by the Meat Puppets. After the You Love Me EP, in 1999, Golden Lies was the second (and final) studio release from the second line-up of the band. Although Derrick Bostrom and Cris Kirkwood do not appear on the album, they were still considered members of the Meat Puppets.

The album is dedicated to Doug Sahm.

Production
Golden Lies was recorded in Austin, Texas, where Curt Kirkwood had moved at the suggestion of Puppets touring guitarist Kyle Ellison. Kirkwood produced the album, his first solo production job in many years. The frontman found making the album as a four-piece to be less confining, and was inspired to try new recording approaches.

Outtakes from the album later formed the basis for Kirkwood's solo album.

Critical reception
Al Shipley of Pitchfork was largely dismissive of the record, describing the album as settling "into a series of unremarkable mid-tempo hard rock tunes," describing the song "Hercules" in particular to be a "clear sign that something is terribly wrong." The Austin Chronicle called the album "a compelling curiosity," writing that it "fits the Meat Puppets' canon nicely, because often enough, it doesn't fit at all." The Morning Call wrote that "although there's enough dyspepsia to please Pepto Bismol wholesalers and Pink Floyd fans around the world, the arbitrary absurdist lyrics keep the angst from etching anything in acid."

The Riverfront Times called the songs "dense desert rock, way too polished for their own good but still containing enough texture and momentum to make it an interesting listen." CMJ New Music Monthly deemed the album "a triumphant trip through the remnants of Kirkwood's brain." The Record called the songs "eclectic, quirky, and tuneful."

Track listing
All songs written by Curt Kirkwood, unless otherwise noted.
  
 "Intro" – 0:51
 "Armed and Stupid" – 3:21
 "I Quit" – 3:01
 "Lamp" – 5:53
 "Hercules" – 3:34
 "Batwing" – 3:08
 "Take Off Your Clothes" – 4:00
 "You Love Me" – 3:51
 "Pieces of Me" – 3:46
 "Push the Button" – 4:52
 "Tarantula" – 4:05
 "Endless Wave" – 4:30
 "Wipeout" – 3:54
 "Fatboy/Fat/Requiem" – 9:50

References

Meat Puppets albums
2000 albums